is a song recorded by Japanese duo Yoasobi from their second EP, The Book 2 (2021). It was released as a stand-alone digital single on September 15, 2021, through Sony Music Entertainment Japan. Written by Ayase, a member of the duo, the song was based on Natsumi's novel Taishō Romance, about a romance between two people who came from different periods that contact via pen pal. Commercially, the song peaked at number two on the Billboard Japan Hot 100, and number five on the Oricon Combined Singles Chart.

Background and release

On July 20, 2020, Monogatary.com, a novel website operated by Sony Music Entertainment Japan, announced a novel contest , for selecting a novel to publish as a book by Futabasha and write a song by Yoasobi. A won novel was announced on October 30, titled , which was written by Natsumi, from the total of 2,086 novels. The story is about Tokito, a boy who lives in the Reiwa period accidentally received a letter from Chiyoko, a girl from the Taishō period, who later became a pen pal and developed a romance.

The song was teased and featured as a main theme of Yoasobi's exhibition, titled Semiconductors Create New Realities, at Sony Park Exhibition, which was held at Ginza Sony Park. "Taishō Roman" officially released digitally on September 15. Later, the song was included on their second EP The Book 2, released on December 1. The English version of the song, titled "Romance", was included on the duo's second English-language EP E-Side 2, released on November 18, 2022.

Composition and lyrics

"Taishō Roman" was written by Ayase, a member, and producer of Yoasobi, and composed in the key of C♯ minor, 130 beats per minute with a running time of 2 minutes and 48 seconds. It is described as a "bittersweet" song with "hooked" piano sound. Valerie Valdez from The Honey Pop said the song is "produce[d] music that gives off the feeling of going through time."

Lyrically, like the based novel, "Taishō Roman" tells a time-lapse romance of two people who span over a hundred years. A boy in present Reiwa period accidentally received a letter written by a girl in Taishō period, 100 years ago. He fell in love with her and would like to meet her, but he could not because of the time difference. The boy learned that the girl was in a period of disaster (1923 Great Kantō earthquake) and wrote to warn her, but she did not reply after that. The girl's letter was sent to him later, described by the boy as "the last love letter". He regarded the letters as proof that girls are alive in her time and are determined to one day convey to her the experience of their own time.

Commercial performance

In Japan's Oricon charts, "Taishō Roman" debuted at number 7 and peaked at number 5 on the Combined Singles Chart. The song also debuted atop the Digital Singles (Single Track) Chart, selling 32,022 download units, becoming the eighth number-one song of the chart. For Billboard Japan, the song debuted at number two on the Japan Hot 100, behind only Kis-My-Ft2's "Fear", selling 28,042 download units (number one on the Download Songs), and with 4,045,151 steams  (number 20 on the Streaming Songs) in first week. The song also entered number 105, and 42 on the Billboard Global 200, and Global Excl. US charts of October 2, respectively.

Music video

An accompanying music video of "Taishō Roman" was premiered on September 16, 2021. The duo released a teaser video of the song on September 13, showing Ikura's voice reading a passages from the based novel Taishō Romance. For the music video, the characters were designed by Eisaku Kubonouchi, artwork was handled by Shinji Kimura, and collaborated with NTT Docomo's new project Quadratic Playground.  The virtual reality music video, created by Quadratic Playground, was released on October 26.

Synopsis

The "Taishō Roman" music video begins with a vivid background, showing Tokito, a boy who wears contemporary clothes, and Chiyoko, a girl who wears Taishō-era kimono, reading a letter with a showy background of kimono pattern, clocks, and household electric appliances flying past behind them. Then, they read it on the street in their era, Reiwa, and Taishō. The background is changed between a modern railway carriage switch and a wood-paneled railway carriage, shown they read a letter in the end.

After that, Tokito turns around to see the giant clock pointing to 11:58 in the background, which is the time that the Great Kantō earthquake occurred. Suddenly, he runs across the showy background and throws a letter into the door being close. Later, he walks crestfallenly, showing the black lyrics on white background. The door opened to show the letter is sent to Chiyoko. She read it and run to throw her reply letter sent to him. He reads the letter while standing on the hour hand of a clock and meet Chiyoko, which stands on the minute hand. Finally, the pair runs towards each other and embraces, but as quickly, the music video ended up with Chiyoko fading from an explosion of light.

Live performance

Yoasobi performed "Taishō Roman" for the first time, alongside "Loveletter", and "Tsubame" at NHK's music show Songs on December 2, 2021.

Credits and personnel

Credits adapted from The Book 2 liner notes and YouTube.

Song

 Ayase – producer, songwriter
 Ikura – vocals
 Natsumi – based story writer
 Takayuki Saitō – vocal recording
 Masahiko Fukui – mixing

Music video

 Yusuke Takase – director, storyboard, worldview design
 Eisaku Kubonouchi – character design
 Yasuhiro Nakura – key animation director, key animation
 Shinji Kimura – art director
 Yūki Hirakawa – worldview CG director
 Kohta Morie – character CG director
 Ryūsuke Suzuki – animation producer
 Toshihiko Sakata – CG producer
 Shaft – animation work
 Shin'ya Nishizawa – key animation
 Kumiko Kawashima – key animation
 Yūgo Ōhashi – key animation
 Riku Honda – key animation
 Yūri Ichinose – key animation
 Asami Ueno – 2nd key animation
 Yōichirō Ōtani – 2nd key animation
 Ryō Shimura – 2nd key animation
 Daniella Padijika – animator
 Shino Yamada – animator
 Xu Jingyuan – animator
 Xu Youzhen – animator
 Momoka Uchida – animator
 Sakura Funayama – animator
 Yang Zhikai – animator
 Yumena Tokutome – animator
 Shintarō Kawakami – animator
 Moemi Sakurai – animator
 Sachika Mori – animator
 Huang Minchun – animator
 Tsuguhisa Furukawa – animator
 Tomoko Murakami – animator
 Miki Matsudo – animator
 Rina Takenawa – animator
 Kaho Katsuya – in-between animation inspection
 Yasuko Watanabe – color design, colorist, inspection
 Fumi Hattori – animation clean-up
 Yūko Kawakami – animation clean-up
 Onba Hayashi – animation clean-up
 Michiko Kado – animation clean-up
 Takayuki Aizu – cell composite
 +Ring
 Kenta Katsuno – worldview CG work
 Ayaka Yamaguchi – worldview CG work
 Tsukasa Iwaki – worldview CG work
 Daiki Miura – worldview CG work
 Akiho Yamada – worldview CG work
 Lipogram
 Miyū Kimura – worldview CG work
 Azuma Takuya – worldview CG work
 Natsumi Katō – worldview CG work
 Modeling Bros
 Shunsuke Imaizumi – worldview CG work
 Yū Minoura – worldview CG work
 Shunsuke Nakajō – worldview CG work
 Kaede Kurodo – worldview CG work
 Kaho Naruo – worldview CG work
 Freelance
 Yasuhito Matsuura – worldview CG work
 Satoshi Mitobe – worldview CG work
 Morie Inc.
 Takehiro Shibano – character CG work
 Naoto Tomita – character CG work
 Marie Shirai – character CG work
 Masato Tajima – character CG work
 Katsura Kidera – character CG work
 Kōetsu Ogawa – character CG work
 Shin'ya Sugawara – character CG work
 Ayūko Kitaoka – character CG work
 Kento Sakai – character CG work
 Ryō Tanbara – character CG work
 Kōtarō Azuma – character CG work
 Yōsuke Ōno – character CG work
 Hayato Kanayama (Transistor Studio) – character CG work
 Ken'ichi Sasaki – online editing
 Takumi Kudō – online editing
 Hatch Inc.
 Ryōichirō Honma – producer
 Seifu Kuroda – producer
 Tatsuya Maekawa – producer
 Sadanori Maeda – text design
 Feng Hao – production manager
 Kiwa Harada – production manager
 Graphinica
 Nao Hirasawa – animation work cooperation
 Ōtsuka Miyū – animation work cooperation
 Ludens
 Akatsuki Watabe – previs work
 Natsumi Ogino – previs work
 Akihiro Satō – previs work
 Masashi Ueno – previs work
 Ryō Shimizu – previs work
 Satoshi Makita – previs work
 Yoshiaki Ishigaya – previs work
 Ryōtarō Hidaka (Starbase Inc.) – creative director
 Hiroki Aonuma (Starbase Inc.) – creative producer
 Quadratic Playground by NTT Docomo, Inc. – production

Charts

Weekly charts

Year-end charts

Certifications

Release history

References

External links
 Taishō Romance on Monogatary.com
 Futabasha's Yoasobi Book

2021 singles
2021 songs
Japanese-language songs
Songs about time travel
Sony Music Entertainment Japan singles
Yoasobi songs